The Ultimate X-Men are a team of mutant superheroes that appear in comic books published by Marvel Comics. The codenames listed under "Character" are those used during the time frame of the particular iteration. Characters with more than one codename for that period have them listed chronologically and separated by a slash (/). Bolded names in the most recent iteration published are the current team members.

X-Men

Kitty Pryde's Free Mutants

Original X-Men

Colossus's X-Men

Emma Frost's Academy of Tomorrow

Karen Grant's The Runaways

Enemies

Nomi Blume's Renegades

The Brotherhood of Mutant Supremacy

Weapon X

The Morlocks

Alpha Flight

Other teams

Bishop's X-Men

Xavier Institute Student Body

Xavier Institute Teaching Staff

Other villains
Apocalypse
Arcade
Crimson Dynamo
Fenris
Hellfire Club (led by Shinobi Shaw)
Major Domo
Mojo Adams
Moira MacTaggert
Proteus
Omega Red
Reavers
Sentinels
Sinister
Stryfe
Bolivar Trask
Shen-Yin Zorn
Magician (Elliot Boggs) - first appears in Ultimate X-Men #66.

X-Men allies
Dai Thomas
Spider-Man (Peter Parker)
Fantastic Four
Lilandra and the Shi'ar
Daredevil (Matt Murdock)
Ultimates

Neutral characters
Gambit
Spiral
Ultimates
S.H.I.E.L.D.

References

X-Men characters, List of Ultimate
Ultimate